Ambassador High School is a Christian high school in Torrance, California. The school was established in 2013 by Michael Barker.

In 2015, a team from Ambassador High School developed an experiment about the usage of wind as a means of pollination in microgravity. This experiment was launched to the International Space Station.

References

External links 
 

High schools in Los Angeles County, California